Skipsfjorden is a branch of the Torskenfjorden in Senja Municipality on the western coast of the large island of Senja in Troms og Finnmark county, Norway.

The mouth of the fjord lies between Selneset on the west and Galgeneset on the east.

The village of Torsken is located at Selneset at the mouth of the fjord.

See also
 List of Norwegian fjords

References

Fjords of Troms og Finnmark
Senja